Hyponerita pinon is a moth of the subfamily Arctiinae. It was described by Herbert Druce in 1911. It is found in Brazil.

References

Phaegopterina
Moths described in 1911